The Seerücken is a hill range of the northern Swiss Plateau, located in the canton of Thurgau. On its north side it overlooks the Untersee branch of Lake Constance.

The summit area of the Seerücken consists of a 700-metre-high plateau, where are the hamlets of Reutenen and Salen. The culminating point (721 m) is located at Büürer Holz, south of Reutenen.

See also
List of most isolated mountains of Switzerland

References

Mountains of Thurgau
Mountains of Switzerland
Mountains of Switzerland under 1000 metres